Thailand participated in the 2010 Asian Para Games–First Asian Para Games in Guangzhou, China from 13 to 19 December 2010. Athletes from Thailand won total 93 medals (including 20 gold), and finished fifth at the medal table.

Medals summary

Medals by sport

References

Nations at the 2010 Asian Para Games
2010 in Thai sport
Thailand at the Asian Para Games